The AFC U-17 Asian Cup, formerly known as the AFC U-16 Championship and AFC U-17 Championship, is a football competition, organised by the Asian Football Confederation (AFC) held once every two years for Asian under-17 teams that also serves as a qualification tournament for the FIFA U-17 World Cup. The top 4 countries qualify to participate in the FIFA U-17 World Cup. Up to 2000, the tournament was for U-16 teams. Between 2002 and 2006 it was held as an under-17 tournament. Between 2008 and 2020, it was switched back to a U-16 Championship. The AFC have proposed switching back to an under-17 tournament starting from 2023. Moreover, the tournament will also be rebranded from the "AFC U-16 Championship" to the "AFC U-17 Asian Cup".

Format

History

Results

Notes:
 a.e.t.: after extra time
 p: after penalty shoot-out
1 No third place match was played.

Successful national teams

Note:
 Results as hosts in bold.

Awards

Participating nations
Legend:
 – Champion
 – 2nd
 – 3rd
 – 4th
 – Semi-finalists
QF – Quarter finals
GS – Group stage
q – Qualified for upcoming tournament
DQ – Disqualified
 ••  – Qualified but withdrew
 •  – Did not qualify
 ×  – Did not enter
 ×  – Withdrew / Banned / Entry not accepted by FIFA
 — Country not affiliated to AFC at that time
 — Country did not exist or national team was inactive
     – Hosts
     – Not affiliated to FIFA

Summary (1985-2018)

Men's U-17 World Cup Qualifiers
Legend
1st – Champions
2nd – Runners-up
3rd – Third place
4th – Fourth place
QF – Quarterfinals
R2 – Round 2
R1 – Round 1
     – Hosts
     – Not affiliated to AFC
q – Qualified for upcoming tournament

See also
AFC U-17 Women's Asian Cup
FIFA U-17 World Cup
AFC U-20 Asian Cup
AFC U-23 Asian Cup

References

Sources
Garin, Erik; Stokkermans, Karel. "Asian U-16 Championships". Rec.Sport.Soccer Statistics Foundation.

External links
 
 

 
Under-16 association football
Asian Football Confederation competitions for national teams